Leca or LECA may refer to:

 LECA, last eukaryotic common ancestor
 LECA, Lutheran Evangelical Church in Africa—Zambia Diocese
 Leca, a village in Antoneşti Commune, Cantemir district, Moldova
 Leca, registered trademark of "light expanded clay aggregate"